Stiehl is a surname. Notable people with the surname include:

Celeste M. Stiehl (born 1925), American politician
Jessica Stiehl, character in the television series Verbotene Liebe
William Donald Stiehl (1925–2016), American judge